This article displays the rosters for the participating teams at the 1997 Tournament of the Americas played in Montevideo, Uruguay from August 21 to August 31, 1997.

Group A

Argentina

4 Gabriel Fernández
5 Héctor Campana
6 Luis Villar
7 Esteban de la Fuente
8 Lucas Victoriano
9 Marcelo Milanesio
10 Juan Espil
11 Diego Osella
12 Gabriel Díaz
13 Jorge Racca
14 Patricio Simoni
15 Rubén Wolkowyski
Head coach:  Julio Lamas

Brazil

4 Raúl
5 Ratto
6 Caio
7 Olívia
8 Josuel
9 Demétrius
10 Alexei
11 Brasília
12 Sandro Varejão
13 Vanderlei
14 Rogério
15 Janjão
Head coach:  Hélio Rubens Garcia

Cuba

4 Ángel Caballero
5 Yudi Abreu
6 Rabdel Echevarría
7 Ulises Goire
8 Héctor Pino
9 Roberto Herrera García
10 Leonardo Pérez
11 Lazaro Borrell
12 Leopoldo Vázquez
13 Eliécer Rojas
14 Ángel Núñez
15 Ruperto Herrera García
Head coach:  Miguel Calderón Gómez

Mexico

4 Óscar Castellanos
5 Antonio Reyes
6 Andrés Contreras
7 Florentino Chávez
8 Enrique González
9 Silvestre Barajas
10 Alberto Martínez
11 Luis López
12 Javier Zavala
13 Erick Martínez
14 Miguel Acuña
15 Rodrigo Pérez
Head coach:  Luis Fernando Wong

Uruguay

4 Camilo Acosta
5 Diego Losada
6 Luis Pierri
7 Freddy Navarrete
8 Nicolás Mazzarino
9 Adolfo Medrick
10 Marcelo Capalbo
11 Óscar Moglia
12 Gustavo Szczygielski
13 Luis Silveira
14 Marcel Bouzout
15 Jesus Rostán
Head coach:  Víctor Hugo Berardi

Group B

Canada

4 Joey Vickery
5 Sherman Hamilton
6 Eli Pasquale
7 Steve Nash
8 William Njoku
9 Rowan Barrett
10 Peter Van Elswyk
11 Rob Wilson
12 Martin Keane
13 Pascal Fleury
14 Michael Meeks
15 Wayne Yearwood
Head coach: / Steve Konchalski

Dominican Republic

4 Ricardo Vásquez
5 Eladio Almonte
6 Soterio Ramírez
7 Moisés Michel
8 Henry Paulino
9 José Mercedes
10 José Molina
11 Héctor Gil
12 Franklin Western
13 Ocaris Lenderborg
14 Carlos Martínez
15 Juan Carlos Eusebio
Head coach:  Miguel Cruzeta

Puerto Rico

4 José Ortiz
5 Eddie Casiano
6 Orlando Santiago
7 Erick Rivera
8 Jerome Mincy
9 James Carter
10 Carlos Lanauze
11 Ramón Rivas
12 Rolando Hourruitiner
13 Édgar de León
14 Luis Allende
15 Daniel Santiago
Head coach:  Carlos Morales

United States

4 Rusty LaRue
5 Corey Beck
6 Jim Farmer
7 Jason Sasser
8 Erik Martin
9 Adrian Griffin
10 Reggie Jordan
11 Kermit Holmes
12 Evers Burns
13 Russ Millard
14 Travis Williams
15 Michael McDonald
Head coach:  Morris McHone

Venezuela

4 Víctor David Díaz
5 José Hernández
6 Ernesto Mijares
7 Richard Lugo
8 Alex Quiroz
9 Víctor González
10 Armando Becker
11 Omar Walcott
12 Richard Medina
13 Gabriel Estaba
14 Iván Olivares
15 Ludwing Irazábal
Head coach:  Julio Toro

Bibliography

External links
1997 Championship of the Americas for Men at fiba.basketball

FIBA AmeriCup squads